is located in Kita-ku, part of Kyoto city, Kyoto Prefecture, Japan.

The Kamo River has its source in the area of the mountain.

For experienced hikers it is a popular trip; they can start in Kumogahata-cho (Kumogahata Town) and after the peak they can continue to Onogo-cho (Onogo Town).

References

External links 
Trip to the peak - part 1
Trip to the peak - part 2

Mountains of Kyoto Prefecture